The 2009 South American Championships in Athletics (Spanish: 2009 Campeonatos Sudamericanos) was the forty sixth edition of the tournament and was held between 19 and 21 June in Lima, Peru.

Brazil dominated the tournament, easily finishing with the highest total points and medals, and also winning the most gold, silver, and bronze medals. Colombia and Argentina took second and third places, respectively, while hosts Peru finished in fifth.

Numerous records were broken at the Championships, including two area records, 10 Championship records and seventeen national records. Both area records were achieved in the 20000 metres track walk event, with Luis Fernando López running 1:20:53.6 in the men's race to break Jefferson Pérez's previous mark, and Johana Ordóñez winning the women's race in 1:34:58. Mario Bazán also beat one of Pérez's records, setting a Championship record in the 3000 metres steeplechase.

Colombian Norma González was the athlete with the most medals at the end of the tournament, with three golds from the 200 metres, 400 metres, and 4×100 metres relay, and a silver from the 4×400 metres relay. A handful of other athletes also won multiple gold medals. Three women won two gold medals: Rosibel García won the 800 and 1500 metres, Germán Lauro took the shot put and discus titles, and Inés Melchor set a national and a Championship record in the 5000 and 10000 metres, respectively. Three male athletes also achieved double golds: Alonso Edward did the 100 and 200 metres sprint double, Andrés Silva won the 400 metres sprint and hurdles, while Byron Piedra won both the 1500 and 5000 metres races.

The competition was marred by drugs bans for medalling athletes: a Brazilian coach, Jayme Netto, admitted that he had administered the banned drug recombinant EPO on five of his athletes without their knowledge, which included: 800 m silver medallist Josiane Tito, 200 m bronze medallist Bruno de Barros, heptathlon champion Lucimara da Silva and 400 m hurdles silver medallist Luciana França. In a separate case, Lucimar Teodoro, the 400 m hurdles gold medallist, also received a two-year ban.

Records

Medal summary

Men's events

Women's events

Final standings

Points table

Medal table

See also
2009 in athletics (track and field)
2009 World Championships in Athletics

References
General
Biscayart, Eduardo (2009-06-20). Murer vaults 4.60m at South American Championships – Day 1 report. IAAF. Retrieved on 2009-06-24.
Biscayart, Eduardo (2009-06-21). Adriano takes seventh South American Discus title – Day 2 report. IAAF. Retrieved on 2009-06-24.
Biscayart, Eduardo (2009-06-22). Brazil repeats triumph at South American Championships – Day 3 report. IAAF. Retrieved on 2009-06-24.
 (archived)
Specific

External links
 

S
South American Championships in Athletics
South
International athletics competitions hosted by Peru
2009 in South American sport